River of Dreams: The Very Best of Hayley Westenra is a Greatest hits album released in UK and New Zealand by Christchurch soprano Hayley Westenra.

River of Dreams contains selections from her three best-selling Decca albums Pure, Odyssey and Treasure, combined with four newly recorded songs. Westenra's distinctive vocals were showcased through classical, traditional, and easy listening repertoires.

The New Zealand Special Edition of this album includes a second CD, featuring nine special fan favorites.

Track listing
United Kingdom version
Pokarekare Ana
River of Dreams (adapted from "Winter" from Vivaldi's Four Seasons)
Dell'amore non si sa  (with Andrea Bocelli)
Shenandoah
The Water Is Wide
Songbird
Both Sides, Now
Ave Maria (Caccini)
Benedictus
Amazing Grace
Danny Boy
Summer Rain
Never Say Goodbye (Adapted from "Pavane")
O Mio Babbino Caro
May It Be
Ave Maria (Bach/Gounod)
Now Is the Hour (Po Atarau/Haere Ra)

New Zealand version, with special edition Bonus disc

Disc 1
Pokarekare Ana
River of Dreams (adapted from "Winter")
Dell'amore non si sa (with Andrea Bocelli)
Shenandoah
Who Painted the Moon Black
The Water Is Wide
Songbird
Both Sides, Now
Ave Maria (Caccini)
Benedictus
Amazing Grace
Danny Boy
Summer Rain
Never Say Goodbye (adapted from "Pavane")
O Mio Babbino Caro
May it Be
Majesty
Ave Maria (Bach/Gounod)
Now Is the Hour (Po Atarau/Haere Ra)

Disc 2:
Hine E Hine
Mary Did You Know
Silent Night
Away in a Manger
Scarborough Fair
Abide with Me
E Pari Ra
Santa Lucia
God Defend New Zealand

Release history

Charts

Album

Certifications

References

External links
 Official Album Site

Hayley Westenra albums
2008 greatest hits albums